İbrahim Özgür (1910 – 11 February 1959) was a Turkish tango composer and singer.

Early life 
Özgür was born into a musical family in Ayazpasa, Istanbul. Özgür learned clarinet and saxophone at the Military Academy in Ankara when he was 16.

Career 
After graduation Özgür returned to Istanbul and formed his own orchestra. In 1931 Özgür embarked on a concert tour for seven years and performed in many East Asia countries such as India, Indonesia, and Singapore. Afterwards, Özgür went back to Turkey and opened a nightclub called “Ates Boceklen”, which means “Glow-worm” in English. Later in 1938, Özgür made his first recording.

He wrote many famous tangos full of nostalgia. His best-known tango, “Mavi Kelebek”, was inspired by an Indian princess whom he met.

References 

1910 births
1959 deaths
Turkish male dancers
20th-century Turkish male singers
Tango singers